The 2013–14 Portland Trail Blazers season was the franchise's 44th season in the National Basketball Association (NBA).

Prior to this season, the Rose Garden was renamed as the Moda Center. The season saw the Blazers improve on their mediocre 2012–13 output, finishing with a 54–28 record, and finishing 5th in the West. After a three-year hiatus, the Blazers returned to the playoffs, facing the Houston Rockets, in the first round, their first meeting since 2009. The Blazers defeated the Rockets in six games, thanks to Damian Lillard's series-clinching three pointer in Game 6 at home, winning their first playoff series since 2000. However, their season ended in the next round with a defeat to the eventual NBA champion San Antonio Spurs in five games.

Key dates
 June 27: The 2013 NBA draft took place at Barclays Center in Brooklyn, New York.
 July 1: 2013 NBA free agency began.

Draft picks

Future draft picks

Credits

2016 second-round draft pick from New York

New York's 2016 second-round pick is protected for selections 31–37 (if this pick falls within its protected range and is therefore not conveyed, then New York's obligation to Portland will be extinguished) [July 15, 2012]

Debits

2014 first-round draft pick to Charlotte

Portland's first-round pick is protected for selections 1–12 in 2014 or 1–12 in 2015 or unprotected in 2016 (Charlotte-Portland, February 24, 2011).

2014 second-round draft pick to Denver

Portland's 2014 second-round pick was traded to Denver (June 24, 2011).

2015 second-round draft pick to Cleveland

Portland's 2015 second-round pick to Cleveland [June 27, 2013]

2016 second-round draft pick to Cleveland

Portland's 2016 second-round pick to Cleveland [June 27, 2013]

2017 second-round draft pick to Houston

Portland's 2017 second-round pick to Houston [July 10, 2013]

Roster

Pre-season

|- style="background:#fcc;"
| 1
| October 7
| L.A. Clippers
| 
| Nicolas Batum (12)
| Robin Lopez (10)
| Damian Lillard (6)
| Moda Center12,849
| 0–1
|- style="background:#fcc;"
| 2
| October 9
| Phoenix
| 
| Damian Lillard (19)
| Claver, Aldridge, Robinson (6)
| Mo Williams (7)
| Moda Center12,653
| 0–2
|- style="background:#cfc;"
| 3
| October 11
| Utah
| 
| Damian Lillard (23)
| Robin Lopez (9)
| Mo Williams (7)
| CenturyLink Arena6,268
| 1–2
|- style="background:#cfc;"
| 4
| October 16
| @ Utah
| 
| Damian Lillard (24)
| Robin Lopez (13)
| Wesley Matthews (5)
| EnergySolutions Arena19,127
| 2–2
|- style="background:#cfc;"
| 5
| October 18
| @ L.A. Clippers
| 
| Damian Lillard (16)
| Thomas Robinson (13)
| Mo Williams (4)
| Staples Center14,849
| 3–2
|- style="background:#cfc;"
| 6
| October 20
| Sacramento
| 
| Damian Lillard (28)
| Nicolas Batum (11)
| Batum & Williams (5)
| Moda Center17,357
| 4–2
|- style="background:#cfc;"
| 7
| October 24
| @ Golden State
| 
| Damian Lillard (21)
| Nicolas Batum (15)
| Mo Williams (7)
| Oracle Arena18,307
| 5–2

Regular season

Season standings

Game log

|- style="background:#fcc;"
| 1
| October 30
| @ Phoenix
| 
| Damian Lillard (32)
| Nicolas Batum (13)
| Batum & Matthews (4)
| US Airways Center17,208
| 0–1

|- style="background:#cfc;"
| 2
| November 1
| @ Denver
| 
| LaMarcus Aldridge (25)
| Wesley Matthews (12)
| Damian Lillard (7)
| Pepsi Center19,155
| 1–1
|- style="background:#cfc;"
| 3
| November 2
| San Antonio
| 
| Damian Lillard (25)
| Nicolas Batum (12)
| Nicolas Batum (11)
| Moda Center20,028
| 2–1
|- style="background:#fcc;"
| 4
| November 5
| Houston
| 
| Damian Lillard (22)
| Robin Lopez (6)
| Mo Williams (7)
| Moda Center17,491
| 2–2
|- style="background:#cfc;"
| 5
| November 8
| Sacramento
| 
| Damian Lillard (22)
| Damian Lillard (8)
| Nicolas Batum (8)
| Moda Center17,627
| 3–2
|- style="background:#cfc;"
| 6
| November 9
| @ Sacramento
| 
| LaMarcus Aldridge (22)
| LaMarcus Aldridge (14)
| Damian Lillard (6)
| Sleep Train Arena15,482
| 4–2
|- style="background:#cfc;"
| 7
| November 11
| Detroit
| 
| Damian Lillard (25)
| LaMarcus Aldridge (12)
| Nicolas Batum (8)
| Moda Center18,834
| 5–2
|- style="background:#cfc;"
| 8
| November 13
| Phoenix
| 
| Thomas Robinson (15)
| Robin Lopez (15)
| Damian Lillard (8)
| Moda Center19,537
| 6–2
|- style="background:#cfc;"
| 9
| November 15
| @ Boston
| 
| LaMarcus Aldridge (27)
| LaMarcus Aldridge (12)
| Mo Williams (8)
| TD Garden18,624
| 7–2
|- style="background:#cfc;"
| 10
| November 17
| @ Toronto
| 
| Aldridge & Lillard (25)
| LaMarcus Aldridge (11)
| Damian Lillard (8)
| Air Canada Centre17,945
| 8–2
|- style="background:#cfc;"
| 11
| November 18
| @ Brooklyn
| 
| LaMarcus Aldridge (27)
| LaMarcus Aldridge (8)
| Damian Lillard (9)
| Barclays Center17,732
| 9–2
|- style="background:#cfc;"
| 12
| November 20
| @ Milwaukee
| 
| LaMarcus Aldridge (21)
| Batum & Lopez (8)
| Nicolas Batum (8)
| BMO Harris Bradley Center11,789
| 10–2
|- style="background:#cfc;"
| 13
| November 22
| Chicago
| 
| Wesley Matthews (28)
| Robin Lopez (16)
| Damian Lillard (6)
| Moda Center20,618
| 11–2
|- style="background:#cfc;"
| 14
| November 23
| @ Golden State
| 
| LaMarcus Aldridge (30)
| LaMarcus Aldridge (21)
| Damian Lillard (9)
| Oracle Arena19,596
| 12–2
|- style="background:#cfc;"
| 15
| November 25
| New York
| 
| Batum & Lillard (23)
| LaMarcus Aldridge (14)
| Batum & Lillard (6)
| Moda Center19,939
| 13–2
|- style="background:#fcc;"
| 16
| November 27
| @ Phoenix
| 
| LaMarcus Aldridge (24)
| Robin Lopez (10)
| Nicolas Batum (5)
| US Airways Center12,731
| 13–3

|- style="background:#cfc;"
| 17
| December 1
| @ L.A. Lakers
| 
| LaMarcus Aldridge (27)
| Robin Lopez (12)
| Batum & Lillard (9)
| Staples Center18,997
| 14–3
|- style="background:#cfc;"
| 18
| December 2
| Indiana
| 
| LaMarcus Aldridge (28)
| LaMarcus Aldridge (10)
| Aldridge, Batum, & Matthews (3)
| Moda Center19,023
| 15–3
|- style="background:#cfc;"
| 19
| December 4
| Oklahoma City
| 
| LaMarcus Aldridge (38)
| LaMarcus Aldridge (13)
| Lillard & Williams (6)
| Moda Center18,950
| 16–3
|- style="background:#cfc;"
| 20
| December 6
| Utah
| 
| Wesley Matthews (24)
| LaMarcus Aldridge (15)
| Damian Lillard (6)
| Moda Center19,833
| 17–3
|- style="background:#fcc;"
| 21
| December 7
| Dallas
| 
| Damian Lillard (32)
| Robin Lopez (14)
| Nicolas Batum (6)
| Moda Center20,142
| 17–4
|- style="background:#cfc;"
| 22
| December 9
| @ Utah
| 
| LaMarcus Aldridge (24)
| Robin Lopez (11)
| Nicolas Batum (11)
| EnergySolutions Arena17,555
| 18–4
|- style="background:#cfc;"
| 23
| December 12
| Houston
| 
| LaMarcus Aldridge (31)
| LaMarcus Aldridge (25)
| Batum & Lillard (6)
| Moda Center19,997
| 19–4
|- style="background:#cfc;"
| 24
| December 14
| @ Philadelphia
| 
| LaMarcus Aldridge (20)
| LaMarcus Aldridge (16)
| Nicolas Batum (9)
| Wells Fargo Center10,189
| 20–4
|- style="background:#cfc;"
| 25
| December 15
| @ Detroit
| 
| LaMarcus Aldridge (27)
| Robin Lopez (13)
| Damian Lillard (7)
| Palace of Auburn Hills13,003
| 21–4
|- style="background:#cfc;"
| 26
| December 17
| @ Cleveland
| 
| Damian Lillard (36)
| LaMarcus Aldridge (15)
| Damian Lillard (10)
| Quicken Loans Arena15,689
| 22–4
|- style="background:#fcc;"
| 27
| December 18
| @ Minnesota
| 
| Damian Lillard (36)
| LaMarcus Aldridge (14)
| Lillard & Williams (6)
| Target Center13,776
| 22–5
|- style="background:#cfc;"
| 28
| December 21
| New Orleans
| 
| Damian Lillard (29)
| Aldridge & Batum (8)
| Nicolas Batum (7)
| Moda Center20,027
| 23–5
|- style="background:#cfc;"
| 29
| December 26
| L.A. Clippers
| 
| LaMarcus Aldridge (32)
| Robin Lopez (15)
| Mo Williams (8)
| Moda Center20,053
| 24–5
|- style="background:#fcc;"
| 30
| December 28
| Miami
| 
| Wesley Matthews (23)
| Joel Freeland (12)
| Batum & Williams (9)
| Moda Center20,071
| 24–6
|- style="background:#fcc;"
| 31
| December 30
| @ New Orleans
| 
| Damian Lillard (29)
| LaMarcus Aldridge (8)
| Nicolas Batum (6)
| New Orleans Arena17,035
| 24–7
|- style="background:#cfc;"
| 32
| December 31
| @ Oklahoma City
| 
| LaMarcus Aldridge (25)
| LaMarcus Aldridge (14)
| Damian Lillard (11)
| Chesapeake Energy Arena18,203
| 25–7

|- style="background:#cfc;"
| 33
| January 2
| Charlotte
| 
| Wesley Matthews (25)
| LaMarcus Aldridge (15)
| Mo Williams (10)
| Moda Center20,014
| 26–7
|- style="background:#fcc;"
| 34
| January 4
| Philadelphia
| 
| LaMarcus Aldridge (29)
| Robin Lopez (15)
| Nicolas Batum (10)
| Moda Center20,004
| 26–8
|- style="background:#fcc;"
| 35
| January 7
| @ Sacramento
| 
| Damian Lillard (41)
| Nicolas Batum (11)
| Mo Williams (6)
| Sleep Train Arena15,518
| 26–9
|- style="background:#cfc;"
| 36
| January 8
| Orlando
| 
| LaMarcus Aldridge (36)
| Nicolas Batum (10)
| Nicolas Batum (14)
| Moda Center18,949
| 27–9
|- style="background:#cfc;"
| 37
| January 11
| Boston
| 
| LaMarcus Aldridge (21)
| Aldridge & Lopez (13)
| Nicolas Batum (7)
| Moda Center20,011
| 28–9
|- style="background:#cfc;"
| 38
| January 15
| Cleveland
| 
| LaMarcus Aldridge (32)
| LaMarcus Aldridge (18)
| Mo Williams (7)
| Moda Center19,998
| 29–9
|- style="background:#cfc;"
| 39
| January 17
| @ San Antonio
| 
| LaMarcus Aldridge (26)
| LaMarcus Aldridge (13)
| Damian Lillard (8)
| AT&T Center18,581
| 30–9
|- style="background:#cfc;"
| 40
| January 18
| @ Dallas
| 
| LaMarcus Aldridge (30)
| Aldridge & Lopez (12)
| Damian Lillard (10)
| American Airlines Center20,375
| 31–9
|- style="background:#fcc;"
| 41
| January 20
| @ Houston
| 
| LaMarcus Aldridge (27)
| LaMarcus Aldridge (20)
| Nicolas Batum (7)
| Toyota Center18,135
| 31–10
|- style="background:#fcc;"
| 42
| January 21
| @ Oklahoma City
| 
| LaMarcus Aldridge (29)
| LaMarcus Aldridge (17)
| Mo Williams (9)
| Chesapeake Energy Arena18,203
| 31–11
|- style="background:#cfc;"
| 43
| January 23
| Denver
| 
| LaMarcus Aldridge (44)
| LaMarcus Aldridge (13)
| Nicolas Batum (10)
| Moda Center20,066
| 32–11
|- style="background:#cfc;"
| 44
| January 25
| Minnesota
| 
| LaMarcus Aldridge (21)
| Robin Lopez (10)
| Mo Williams (6)
| Moda Center20,006
| 33–11
|- style="background:#fcc;"
| 45
| January 26
| @ Golden State
| 
| Wesley Matthews (21)
| Aldridge & Robinson
| Damian Lillard (4)
| Oracle Arena19,596
| 33–12
|- style="background:#fcc;"
| 46
| January 28
| Memphis
| 
| LaMarcus Aldridge (27)
| LaMarcus Aldridge (16)
| Wesley Matthews (5)
| Moda Center19,385
| 33–13

|- style="background:#cfc;"
| 47
| February 1
| Toronto
| 
| LaMarcus Aldridge (27)
| LaMarcus Aldridge (15)
| Damian Lillard (7)
| Moda Center19,996
| 34–13
|- style="background:#fcc;"
| 48
| February 3
| @ Washington
| 
| Damian Lillard (25)
| LaMarcus Aldridge (10)
| Damian Lillard (8)
| Verizon Center13,259
| 34–14
|- style="background:#cfc;"
| 49
| February 5
| @ New York
| 
| Nicolas Batum (20)
| LaMarcus Aldridge (12)
| LaMarcus Aldridge (5)
| Madison Square Garden19,812
| 35–14
|- style="background:#fcc;"
| 50
| February 7
| @ Indiana
| 
| Damian Lillard (38)
| Robin Lopez (14)
| Damian Lillard (11)
| Bankers Life Fieldhouse18,165
| 35–15
|- style="background:#cfc;"
| 51
| February 8
| @ Minnesota
| 
| LaMarcus Aldridge (26)
| Robin Lopez (11)
| Wesley Matthews (6)
| Target Center17,506
| 36–15
|- style="background:#fcc;"
| 52
| February 11
| Oklahoma City
| 
| Nicolas Batum (18)
| Robin Lopez (14)
| Damian Lillard (7)
| Moda Center20,018
| 36–16
|- style="background:#fcc;"
| 53
| February 12
| @ L.A. Clippers
| 
| LaMarcus Aldridge (25)
| Nicolas Batum (7)
| Nicolas Batum (7)
| Staples Center19,175
| 36–17
|- align="center"
|colspan="9" bgcolor="#bbcaff"|All-Star Break
|- style="background:#fcc;"
| 54
| February 19
| San Antonio
| 
| Damian Lillard (31)
| Robin Lopez (14)
| Damian Lillard (6)
| Moda Center20,057
| 36–18
|- style="background:#cfc;"
| 55
| February 21
| Utah
| 
| Damian Lillard (28)
| Robin Lopez (18)
| Damian Lillard (7)
| Moda Center19,998
| 37–18
|- style="background:#cfc;"
| 56
| February 23
| Minnesota
| 
| Damian Lillard (32)
| Thomas Robinson (18)
| Damian Lillard (5)
| Moda Center19,458
| 38–18
|- style="background:#cfc;"
| 57
| February 25
| @ Denver
| 
| Damian Lillard (31)
| Robin Lopez (10)
| Damian Lillard (9)
| Pepsi Center16,058
| 39–18
|- style="background:#cfc;"
| 58
| February 26
| Brooklyn
| 
| Mo Williams (21)
| Will Barton (11)
| Mo Williams (7)
| Moda Center20,015
| 40–18

|- style="background:#cfc;"
| 59
| March 1
| Denver
| 
| Robin Lopez (18)
| Nicolas Batum (16)
| Nicolas Batum (6)
| Moda Center20,068
| 41–18
|- style="background:#fcc;"
| 60
| March 3
| L.A. Lakers
| 
| LaMarcus Aldridge (21)
| Robin Lopez (16)
| Lillard, Batum, & Williams (5)
| Moda Center20,013
| 41–19
|- style="background:#cfc;"
| 61
| March 5
| Atlanta
| 
| Mo Williams (15)
| Nicolas Batum (18)
| Damian Lillard (6)
| Moda Center20,043
| 42–19
|- style="background:#fcc;"
| 62
| March 7
| @ Dallas
| 
| LaMarcus Aldridge (30)
| LaMarcus Aldridge (17)
| Nicolas Batum (5)
| American Airlines Center20,251
| 42–20
|- style="background:#fcc;"
| 63
| March 9
| @ Houston
| 
| LaMarcus Aldridge (28)
| Batum & Aldridge (12)
| Mo Williams (11)
| Toyota Center18,321
| 42–21
|- style="background:#fcc;"
| 64
| March 11
| @ Memphis
| 
| Damian Lillard (32)
| LaMarcus Aldridge (10)
| Damian Lillard (7)
| FedExForum17,391
| 42–22
|- style="background:#fcc;"
| 65
| March 12
| @ San Antonio
| 
| Damian Lillard (23)
| Nicolas Batum (14)
| Wesley Matthews (4)
| AT&T Center18,581
| 42–23
|- style="background:#cfc;"
| 66
| March 14
| @ New Orleans
| 
| Damian Lillard (27)
| Nicolas Batum (18)
| Batum & Lillard (5)
| Smoothie King Center16,913
| 43–23
|- style="background:#fcc;"
| 67
| March 16
| Golden State
| 
| Damian Lillard (26)
| Nicolas Batum (14)
| Damian Lillard (7)
| Moda Center20,063
| 43–24
|- style="background:#cfc;"
| 68
| March 18
| Milwaukee
| 
| Wesley Matthews (26)
| Robin Lopez (14)
| Nicolas Batum (9)
| Moda Center19,572
| 44–24
|- style="background:#cfc;"
| 69
| March 20
| Washington
| 
| Wesley Matthews (28)
| Nicolas Batum (14)
| Damian Lillard (10)
| Moda Center19,571
| 45–24
|- style="background:#fcc;"
| 70
| March 22
| @ Charlotte
| 
| Damian Lillard (20)
| Batum & Wright (6)
| Nicolas Batum (6)
| Time Warner Cable Arena18,706
| 45–25
|- style="background:#fcc;"
| 71
| March 24
| @ Miami
| 
| Damian Lillard (19)
| Nicolas Batum (10)
| Damian Lillard (6)
| American Airlines Arena20,030
| 45–26
|- style="background:#fcc;"
| 72
| March 25
| @ Orlando
| 
| Robin Lopez (20)
| Robin Lopez (13)
| Nicolas Batum (4)
| Amway Center17,896
| 45–27
|- style="background:#cfc;"
| 73
| March 27
| @ Atlanta
| 
| LaMarcus Aldridge (25)
| LaMarcus Aldridge (16)
| Mo Williams (11)
| Philips Arena13,228
| 46–27
|- style="background:#cfc;"
| 74
| March 28
| @ Chicago
| 
| Mo Williams (18)
| LaMarcus Aldridge (13)
| Batum & Lillard (4)
| United Center22,055
| 47–27
|- style="background:#cfc;"
| 75
| March 30
| Memphis
| 
| LaMarcus Aldridge (28)
| Robin Lopez (10)
| Nicolas Batum (6)
| Moda Center19,994
| 48–27

|- style="background:#cfc;"
| 76
| April 1
| @ L.A. Lakers
| 
| Damian Lillard (34)
| LaMarcus Aldridge (15)
| Damian Lillard (8)
| Staples Center18,110
| 49–27
|- style="background:#fcc;"
| 77
| April 4
| Phoenix
| 
| Aldridge & Lopez (18)
| Robin Lopez (13)
| Damian Lillard (7)
| Moda Center20,089
| 49–28
|- style="background:#cfc;"
| 78
| April 6
| New Orleans
| 
| LaMarcus Aldridge (25)
| LaMarcus Aldridge (18)
| Damian Lillard (5)
| Moda Center20,036
| 50–28
|- style="background:#cfc;"
| 79
| April 9
| Sacramento
| 
| LaMarcus Aldridge (22)
| Lopez & Robinson (9)
| Damian Lillard (10)
| Moda Center20,002
| 51–28
|- style="background:#cfc;"
| 80
| April 11
| @ Utah
| 
| Wesley Matthews (21)
| LaMarcus Aldridge (14)
| Nicolas Batum (7)
| EnergySolutions Arena19,248
| 52–28
|- style="background:#cfc;"
| 81
| April 13
| Golden State
| 
| LaMarcus Aldridge (26)
| Nicolas Batum (12)
| Batum & Lillard (5)
| Moda Center19,995
| 53–28
|- style="background:#cfc;"
| 82
| April 16
| L.A. Clippers
| 
| Will Barton (23)
| Will Barton (10)
| Batum & Claver (4)
| Moda Center20,021
| 54–28

Playoffs

Game log

|- style="background:#cfc;"
| 1
| April 20
| @ Houston
| 
| LaMarcus Aldridge (46)
| LaMarcus Aldridge (18)
| Damian Lillard (5)
| Toyota Center18,240
| 1–0
|- style="background:#cfc;"
| 2
| April 23
| @ Houston
| 
| LaMarcus Aldridge (43)
| Robin Lopez (10)
| Damian Lillard (11)
| Toyota Center18,331
| 2–0
|- style="background:#fcc;"
| 3
| April 25
| Houston
| 
| Damian Lillard (30)
| LaMarcus Aldridge (10)
| Damian Lillard (6)
| Moda Center20,302
| 2–1
|- style="background:#cfc;"
| 4
| April 27
| Houston
| 
| LaMarcus Aldridge (29)
| Robin Lopez (11)
| Damian Lillard (8)
| Moda Center20,246
| 3–1
|- style="background:#fcc;"
| 5
| April 30
| @ Houston
| 
| Wesley Matthews (27)
| Aldridge, Lillard & Lopez (8)
| Damian Lillard (7)
| Toyota Center18,230
| 3–2
|- style="background:#cfc;"
| 6
| May 2
| Houston
| 
| LaMarcus Aldridge (30)
| LaMarcus Aldridge (13)
| Nicolas Batum (7)
| Moda Center20,204
| 4–2

|- style="background:#fcc;"
| 1
| May 6
| @ San Antonio
| 
| LaMarcus Aldridge (32)
| LaMarcus Aldridge (14)
| Mo Williams (4)
| AT&T Center18,581
| 0–1
|- style="background:#fcc;"
| 2
| May 8
| @ San Antonio
| 
| Nicolas Batum (21)
| LaMarcus Aldridge (10)
| Damian Lillard (5)
| AT&T Center18,581
| 0–2
|- style="background:#fcc;"
| 3
| May 10
| San Antonio
| 
| Wesley Matthews (22)
| LaMarcus Aldridge (12)
| Damian Lillard (9)
| Moda Center20,321
| 0–3
|- style="background:#cfc;"
| 4
| May 12
| San Antonio
| 
| Damian Lillard (25)
| Nicolas Batum (14)
| Nicolas Batum (8)
| Moda Center20,141
| 1–3
|- style="background:#fcc;"
| 5
| May 14
| @ San Antonio
| 
| LaMarcus Aldridge (21)
| Nicolas Batum (12)
| Damian Lillard (10)
| AT&T Center18,581
| 1–4

Player statistics

Transactions

Portland
Portland Trail Blazers seasons
Portland Trail Blazers 2013
Portland Trail Blazers 2013
Port
Port